L' (L + apostrophe), or Lʼ (L + modifier apostrophe) may represent:
 an abbreviated form of a French definite article
 the compose key sequence for Ĺ (L + acute accent)
 palatalised l, in Slavic notation

It looks similar to:
 Ľ (L + caron), a letter used in the Slovak alphabet and in some versions of the Ukrainian Latin alphabet
 ɬʼ, the International Phonetic Alphabet symbol for the alveolar lateral ejective fricative
 L′ (L + prime)
 Lʻ (L + ʻokina)
 Lʾ (L + right half ring)
 Lʿ (L + left half ring)